Washington Initiative 1240 "concerns creation of a public charter school system" was an  initiative that appeared on the Washington state general ballot in November 2012. Originally filed with the Washington Secretary of State on May 31, proponents and paid signature gatherers collected enough signatures to be certified for the ballot on July 25, making it one of the fastest initiatives ever to do so, at an estimated cost of  more than $6 per signature. Proposed charter schools would receive public funding but not be governed by local school districts. An August 2012 financial impact study by the state Office of Financial Management estimated "an indeterminate, but non-zero, fiscal impact to local public school districts" and "known state agency implementation costs" of at least $3 million in the first five years.
The initiative was approved by voters in November 2012.

Ballot measure title and summary 

The full text of the measure is available online.

Language describing I-1240 was challenged in court. As described by the Secretary of State's office, I-1240 "would authorize up to forty funded charter schools open to all students, operated through approved, nonreligious, nonprofit organizations, with government oversight; and modify certain laws applicable to them as public schools."

This measure would allow a created state commission or approved local school boards to authorize qualifying nonreligious, nonprofit organizations to operate public charter schools, limited to forty schools over five years. Public charter schools would receive standard per-student public school funding and be open to all students without tuition. Public charter schools would be subject to teacher certification requirements, government oversight, and performance reporting requirements, but exempt from certain state laws and school district policies.

Support and Opposition

Washington voters previously rejected charter school measures. Beginning with I-177 in 1996,
then I-729 in 2000
and Referendum 55 in 2004.  Each of these proposals was brought forward by a few wealthy individuals and actively opposed by public school teachers, administrators and parent groups. Republican gubernatorial candidate Rob McKenna supports the measure, with democratic opponent Jay Inslee opposed. As per RCW 42.17A on "campaign disclosure and contribution," the Washington state Public Disclosure Commission posts campaign information online, including committee and donor information for referendums and initiatives As of August, 2012, PDC records show proponents of I-1240 with a nearly 50:1 fundraising advantage.

Statements for and against each ballot measure are available online as part of the official online voter's guide.

Support

The registered sponsor for the initiative was the League of Education Voters.  I-1240 campaign was funded partly by a "handful" of Puget Sound area billionaires, including Bill Gates, Paul Allen and the parents of Jeff Bezos.
Alice Walton was also among the top five contributors.
The measure was also endorsed by Stand for Children.

Opposition

The League of Women Voters of Washington opposed the measure,
as did the Washington Education Association
and the Washington Association of School Administrators.
The National Association for the Advancement of Colored People has been opposed to all charter schools since 2010,
and, although the National Parent Teacher Association conditionally supports charter schools, the Washington State PTA opposed I-1240 for not meeting "criteria for local oversight." A variety of Democratic organizations and officials oppose I-1240.

Election results

Voters approved Initiative 1240 at the ballot box. The statewide vote to approve the measure was 50.69%; the vote to reject was 49.31%.

See also 
Charter schools

References

External links
The Washington Coalition for Public Charter Schools is the primary organization campaigning for I-1240
No on 1240
People for Our Public Schools

Public education in Washington (state)
2012 Washington (state) ballot measures
Washington (state) law
Initiatives in the United States